Buanzimakhi (Dargwa: БургӀянзимахьи) is a rural locality (a selo) in Ayalakabsky Selsoviet, Levashinsky District, Republic of Dagestan, Russia. The population was 170 as of 2010. There are 2 streets.

Geography 
It is located 11 km east of Levashi, on the Kakaozen River.

Nationalities 
Dargins live there.

References 

Rural localities in Levashinsky District